Professor Poon Chung-kwong, GBS, OBE, JP (born 1940, Hong Kong) was the President of the Hong Kong Polytechnic University from 1991 to 2008.

He received his secondary education at St. Paul's Co-educational College. Trained as a chemist, he holds doctorates of science and of philosophy from the University College London. He has been a visiting scholar at University of Southern California and at California Institute of Technology. In addition to being the chief administrator of Hong Kong's largest scientific/technical university he is also a member of the National Committee of the Chinese People's Political Consultative Conference.

His late cousin was the singer Leslie Cheung.

See also
 Education in Hong Kong

References

External links
Hong Kong Polytechnic University

1940 births
Living people
People from Panyu District
Heads of universities in Hong Kong
Alumni of St. Paul's Co-educational College
Alumni of the University of Hong Kong
Alumni of St. John's College, University of Hong Kong
Alumni of University College London
Hong Kong Buddhists
Members of the National Committee of the Chinese People's Political Consultative Conference
Officers of the Order of the British Empire
Academic staff of Hong Kong Polytechnic University
Business and Professionals Federation of Hong Kong politicians
Recipients of the Gold Bauhinia Star
HK LegCo Members 1985–1988
HK LegCo Members 1988–1991
Members of the Election Committee of Hong Kong, 2007–2012
Members of the Preparatory Committee for the Hong Kong Special Administrative Region
Members of the Selection Committee of Hong Kong
Hong Kong Basic Law Consultative Committee members